The 2022–23 Jacksonville Dolphins men's basketball team represented Jacksonville University in the 2022–23 NCAA Division I men's basketball season. The Dolphins, led by second-year head coach Jordan Mincy, played their home games at Swisher Gymnasium in Jacksonville, Florida as members of the ASUN Conference. They finished the season 13–16, 6–12 in ASUN play to finish in a tie for 11th place. They failed to qualify for the ASUN tournament.

Previous season
The Dolphins finished the 2021–22 season 21–10, 11–5 in ASUN play to finish in second place in the East Division. They defeated Central Arkansas and Jacksonville State to advance to the ASUN tournament championship game. There they lost to Bellarmine.

Roster

Schedule and results

|-
!colspan=12 style=| Non-conference regular season

|-
!colspan=12 style=| ASUN regular season

Sources

References

Jacksonville Dolphins men's basketball seasons
Jacksonville Dolphins
Jacksonville Dolphins men's basketball
Jacksonville Dolphins men's basketball